Hayabusa Terra  is a surface feature on the dwarf planet Pluto. It was discovered by the New Horizons spacecraft in July 2015. It is named for Hayabusa, the first spacecraft to successfully return a sample of an asteroid to Earth. The name has been officially approved by the International Astronomical Union on 7 September 2017.

References

Regions of Pluto